Carina Schlichting Beduschi (born December 19, 1984) is a Brazilian actress, TV host, architect, model and beauty queen who represented Brazil at the Miss Universe 2005.

Beduschi was elected as the 51st Miss Brasil on 14 April 2005 at Copacabana Palace Hotel in Rio de Janeiro. Before competing at Miss Brasil, she had won Miss Santa Catarina 2005 contest. In May 2005, she competed in the Miss Universe 2005 pageant held in Thailand. She is cousin of Isabel Cristina Beduschi won Miss Santa Catarina and Miss Brasil contests in 1988.

Biography
Beduschi was born in Florianópolis, Santa Catarina. Her father, Domingos Sávio Beduschi, is of Italian descent and her mother, Helena Márcia Schlichting Beduschi, is of German descent. Beduschi, who is majoring in architecture at private university UNISUL (Universidade do Sul, in Santa Catarina) had to stop her studies at the college during her reign, to be able to fulfill her duties for Organização Miss Brasil Oficial.

She has appeared in magazines such as Caras and pictures of her, taken in Rio de Janeiro were shown in local newspapers, such as O Dia and Extra.

She has been interviewed by TNT channel. Beduschi has also been an invitee on Luiz Carlos Prattes' show, at CBN Diário and TVCom, and visited the state of Santa Catarina Legislative Assembly.

Stats
 Hair: blonde
 Eyes: hazel
 Height: 180 cm
 Weight: 59 kg
 Chest: 88 cm
 Hips: 88 cm
 Waist: 60 cm

References
  Chat at Terra (27 September 2005)
  A virada da miss - IstoÉ Gente

External links
 Miss Universe website

1984 births
Brazilian female models
Brazilian people of German descent
Brazilian people of Italian descent
Living people
Miss Brazil winners
Miss Universe 2005 contestants
People from Florianópolis
Brazilian models of German descent